Syllepte pilocrocialis is a moth in the family Crambidae. It was described by Strand in 1918. It is found in Taiwan.

References

Moths described in 1918
pilocrocialis
Moths of Taiwan